Lists of mammals by region cover mammals found in different parts of the world. They are organized by continent, region, and country, and in some places by sub-national region.
Most are full species lists, while those for Australia and the Caribbean have links to more specific species lists.

Africa

Eastern Africa

 Burundi
 Comoros
 Djibouti
 Eritrea
 Ethiopia
 Kenya
 Madagascar
 Malawi
 Mauritius
 Mayotte (FR)
 Mozambique
 Réunion (FR)
 Rwanda
 Seychelles
 Somalia
 South Sudan
 Uganda
 Tanzania
 Zanzibar
 Zambia
 Zimbabwe

Central Africa

 Angola
 Cameroon
 Central African Republic
 Chad
 Republic of the Congo
 Democratic Republic of the Congo
 Equatorial Guinea
 Gabon
 São Tomé and Príncipe

Northern Africa

 Algeria
 Egypt
 Libya
 Morocco
 Sudan
 Tunisia
 Western Sahara
 Canary Islands (ES)
 Ceuta (ES)
 Melilla (ES)
 Madeira (PT)

Southern Africa

 Botswana
 Eswatini
 Lesotho
 Namibia
 South Africa

Western Africa

 Benin
 Burkina Faso
 Cape Verde
 The Gambia
 Ghana
 Guinea
 Guinea-Bissau
 Ivory Coast
 Liberia
 Mali
 Mauritania
 Niger
 Nigeria
 Saint Helena (UK)
 Ascension Island
 Tristan da Cunha
 Inaccessible Island
 Nightingale Islands
 Gough
 Senegal
 Sierra Leone
 Togo

Americas

Caribbean

 Anguilla (UK)
 Antigua and Barbuda
 Aruba (NL)
 Bahamas
 Barbados
 Cayman Islands (UK)
 Cuba
 Dominica
 Dominican Republic
 Grenada
 Guadeloupe (FR)
 Haiti
 Jamaica
 Martinique (FR)
 Montserrat (UK)
 Netherlands Antilles (NL)
 Puerto Rico (US)
 Saint-Barthélemy (FR)
 Saint Kitts and Nevis
 Saint Lucia
 Saint Martin (FR)
 Sint Maarten (NL)
 Saint Vincent and the Grenadines
 Trinidad and Tobago
 Turks and Caicos Islands (UK)
 British Virgin Islands (UK)
 United States Virgin Islands (US)

Central America

 Belize
 Costa Rica
 El Salvador
 Guatemala
 Honduras
 Nicaragua
 Panama

North America

 Mexico
 Bermuda (UK)
 Canada
 Alberta
 British Columbia
 Manitoba
 Newfoundland and Labrador
 Northwest Territories
 Nova Scotia
 Nunavut
 Ontario
 New Brunswick
 Prince Edward Island
 Quebec
 Saskatchewan
 Yukon
 Greenland (DK)
 Saint Pierre and Miquelon (FR)
 United States of America
New England
 Connecticut
 Maine
 Massachusetts
 New Hampshire
 Rhode Island
 Vermont
 Alabama
 Alaska
 Arizona
 Arkansas
 California
 Colorado
 Delaware
 Florida
 Georgia
 Idaho
 Illinois
 Indiana
 Iowa
 Kansas
 Kentucky
 Louisiana
 Maryland
 Michigan
 Minnesota
 Mississippi
 Missouri
 Montana
 Nebraska
 Nevada
 New Jersey
 New Mexico
 New York
 North Carolina
 North Dakota
 Ohio
 Oklahoma
 Oregon
 Pennsylvania
 South Carolina
 South Dakota
 Tennessee
 Texas
 Utah
 Virginia
 Washington
 West Virginia
 Wisconsin
 Wyoming

South America

 Argentina
 Bolivia
 Brazil
 Fernando de Noronha
 Chile
 Juan Fernández Islands
 Colombia
 Ecuador
 Galápagos Islands
 Falkland Islands (UK)
 French Guiana (FR)
 Guyana
 Paraguay
 Peru
 Suriname
 Uruguay
 Venezuela

Asia

Central Asia

 Kazakhstan
 Kyrgyzstan
 Tajikistan
 Turkmenistan
 Uzbekistan

Eastern Asia

 China
 Tibet
 Manchuria
 Hong Kong 
 Macau 
 Japan
 Bonin Islands
 Ryukyu Islands
 Korea
 North Korea
 South Korea
 Taiwan
 Mongolia

Southeastern Asia

 Brunei
 Cambodia
 East Timor
 Indonesia
 Borneo
 Irian Jaya
 Java
 Kalimantan
 Lesser Sunda Islands
 Maluku Islands
 Sulawesi
 Sumatra
 West Timor
 Laos
 Malaysia
 Malay Peninsula
 Malaysian Borneo
 Myanmar
 Philippines
 Luzon
 Mindanao
 Mindoro
 Negros
 Palawan
 Panay
 Samar
 Singapore
 South China Sea Islands
 Paracel Islands (CN)
 Pratas Island (TW)
 Spratly Islands (CN, MY, PH, TW, VN)
 Thailand
 Vietnam

Southern Asia

 Afghanistan
 Bangladesh
 Bhutan
 Chagos Archipelago (UK)
 Cocos (Keeling) Islands (AU)
 India
 Andaman and Nicobar Islands
 Maldives
 Nepal
 Pakistan
 Sri Lanka

Western Asia

 Armenia
 Azerbaijan
 Bahrain
 Georgia
 Iran
 Iraq
 Israel
 Jordan
 Kuwait
 Lebanon
 Oman
 Palestine
 Qatar
 Saudi Arabia
 Syria
 Turkey
 Cyprus
 United Arab Emirates
 Yemen

Europe

Central Europe
 Austria
 Czech Republic
 Germany
 Hungary
 Liechtenstein
 Poland
 Slovakia
 Switzerland

Eastern Europe
 Belarus
 Russia
 Ukraine

Northern Europe

 Denmark
 Faroe Islands
 Estonia
 Finland
 Åland Islands
 Iceland
 Ireland
 Latvia
 Lithuania
 Norway
 Jan Mayen
 Svalbard
 Sweden
 United Kingdom
 Channel Islands
 Guernsey
 Jersey
 England
 Isle of Man
 Scotland
 Wales
 Cornwall

Southern Europe

 Albania
 Andorra
 Bosnia and Herzegovina
 Bulgaria
 Corsica (FR)
 Croatia
 Gibraltar (UK)
 Greece
 Crete
 Italy
 Sardinia
 Sicily
 Malta
 Moldova
 Monaco
 Montenegro
 North Macedonia
 Portugal
 Azores
 Romania
 San Marino
 Serbia
 Slovenia
 Spain
 Basque Country
 Balearic Islands
 Vatican City

Western Europe

 Belgium
 France
 Brittany
 Luxembourg
 Netherlands

Oceania and Antarctica

Australia & New Zealand

 Australia
 Australian Capital Territory
 Coral Sea Islands
 Queensland
 New South Wales
 Northern Territory
 South Australia
 Tasmania
 Victoria
 Western Australia
 Norfolk Island
Ashmore Reef 
Christmas Island
 New Zealand
 Chatham Islands
 Kermadec Islands
 North Island
 South Island

Melanesia

 Fiji
 New Caledonia (FR)
 Northern Torres Strait islands (AU)
 East Timor
 Papua New Guinea
 Bismarck Archipelago
 Solomon Islands
 Vanuatu

Micronesia

 Guam (US)
 Kiribati
 Marshall Islands
 Federated States of Micronesia
 Nauru
 Northern Mariana Islands (US)
 Palau
 Palmyra Atoll (US)

Polynesia

 American Samoa (US)
 Cook Islands (NZ)
 Easter Island (CL)
 French Polynesia (FR)
 Hawaii (US)
 Johnston Atoll (US)
 Midway Islands (US)
 Niue (NZ)
 Pitcairn (UK)
 Samoa
 Tokelau (NZ)
 Tonga
 Tuvalu
 Wake Island (US)
 Wallis and Futuna (FR)

Antarctica & Southern Ocean islands

 Antarctica
 Bouvet Island (NO)
 British Antarctic Territory (UK)
 South Georgia and the South Sandwich Islands
 South Orkney Islands
 South Shetland Islands
 French Southern Territories (FR)
 Amsterdam Island
 Crozet Islands
 Kerguelen Islands
 Saint Paul Island
 Heard and McDonald Islands (AU)
 Macquarie Island (AU)
 Prince Edward Islands (S. Africa)

See also global lists 
List of mammals
Lists of mammals by population

See also
List of mammalogists

External links
European Mammal Atlas EMMA from Societas Europaea Mammalogica

Mammals